The Britannia Range is a subrange of the North Shore Mountains, running along the eastern flank of Howe Sound just north of Vancouver, British Columbia, Canada. The range begins in the Deeks Lake/Hanover Mountain area to the north of Brunswick Mountain, which is the highest of the summits of the Cypress Mountain ski area at Cypress Provincial Park above West Vancouver, though that summit is not in the range.  The range is bounded by the Stawamus River to the north, Loch Lomond on the upper Seymour River, and is the source of the name of Britannia Beach which is towards its northern end.

The range's name was conferred by Captain Richards after the 100-gun HMS Britannia, which saw action at the Battle of St. Vincent, 1797 and the Battle of Trafalgar, 1805.  Mountains within the range allude to British royalty - Hanover and Windsor for the respective dynasties.  The range includes Sky Pilot Mountain, a horn-shaped summit prominently visible to southbound traffic on BC Highway 99 on the descent from Whistler to Squamish.

See also
Fannin Range

References

Sea-to-Sky Corridor
Mountain ranges of British Columbia
North Shore Mountains